The Tyrolean Rebellion is a name given to the resistance of militiamen, peasants, craftsmen and other civilians of the County of Tyrol led by Andreas Hofer supported by his wife Anna and a strategic council consisting of Josef Speckbacher, Peter Mayr, Capuchin Father Joachim Haspinger, Major Martin Teimer and Kajetan Sveth, against new legislation and a compulsory vaccination programme concerning smallpox ordered by King Maximilian I of Bavaria, followed by the military occupation of their homeland by troops organised and financed by Napoleon I of the First French Empire and Maximilian I. The broader military context is called the War of the Fifth Coalition.

Backgrounds

Governing and military situation 
In September 1805 the Electorate of Bavaria under Prince-elector Maximilian I Joseph of Wittelsbach, that had been allied with the Habsburg monarchy under the common federally structured Holy Roman Empire, went over to Napoleonic France: the Bavarian Minister Count Maximilian von Montgelas, realizing the French superiority while fearing the ambitions of the newly established Austrian Empire, signed a secret defence alliance at Bogenhausen. At the end of the War of the Third Coalition shortly afterwards, Bavarian ruling class found itself on the victorious side. In 1805 the warring parties did agree on the Peace of Pressburg treaty where Bavaria was elevated to a kingdom and gained French-occupied Tyrol, which since 1363 had been held by the dynasty of the Habsburgs, who, defeated by Napoleon at the Battle of Austerlitz, were forced to renounce it. Napoleon officially handed over the Tyrolean county including the secularized Bishopric of Trent (Trentino) to the Bavarian king on February 11, 1806.

Policies 
In its policies and legislation, the Bavarian government under minister Count Montgelas angered the Tyrolean population in several ways. By writing new rules, by reorganising the schooling system, by abolishing the ages old Tyrolean people's right to selfdefence (Wehrverfassung) and by raising taxes, but at the same time barring exports, e.g. of cattle, from Tyrol into Bavaria. Furthermore, the state mingled into the affairs of the church in Tyrol, banning traditional rural holidays, the ringing of church bells, processions etc. which were a vital part of Tyrolean culture. Additionally, on May 1, 1808, the County of Tyrol was disestablished and administratively split up into the three districts of Inn, Eisack and Etsch. The new Bavarian constitution also replaced long existing feudal rights that had given privileges to the Tyrolean population, such as not having to fight in a foreign army and outside the Tyrolean borders. Conscription was thus introduced in Tyrol and Tyrolese called into Bavarian military service, which led to open revolt. Also because Bavaria had to deliver soldiers for Napoleon's devastating wars in Russia and Spain, which were more or less one way tickets. On top of this the Bavarians did order a compulsory vaccination programme against smallpox in 1807, with massive fines. For the Tyroleans this was pure blasphemy.

Outbreak and course of the rebellion 
The trigger for the outbreak of the uprising of the Tyrolean civilians was the flight to Innsbruck of young men that were due to be called into the Bavarian army by the authorities at Axams on March 12 and 13, 1809. The persons in hiding stayed in contact with the Austrian court in Vienna by their conduit Baron Joseph Hormayr, an Innsbruck-born Hofrat and close friend of Archduke John of Austria. The Austrian Empire, citing a breach of the conditions agreed in the Peace of Pressburg guaranteeing Tyrolean autonomy, declared war on the Bavarian-French allies on April 9, 1809. Archduke John explicitly stated that Bavaria had forfeit all rights to Tyrol, which rightfully belonged with the Austrian lands, and therefore any resistance against Bavarian occupation would be legitimate.

An Austrian corps under General Johann Gabriel Chasteler de Courcelles operating from Carinthia occupied Lienz and marched against Innsbruck, but was defeated by Bavarian troops led by French Marshal François Joseph Lefebvre near Wörgl on 13 May.

Meanwhile, an army of Tyrolean citizen militia (Schützen), joined by peasants, craftsmen and other civilians, under the command of innkeeper, wine merchant and cattle dealer Andreas Hofer upon the war message had gathered around Sterzing and marched north towards the Brenner Pass. There they did build barricades on strategic points. In the First and Second Battle of Bergisel near Innsbruck on April 12 and 25 May, the Tyrolean troops fought against the Bavarians, who were forced to retreat.

The Tyroleans celebrated the news that Napoleon had suffered defeat at the Battle of Aspern-Essling on 22 May. Nevertheless, after the French again gained the upper hand at the Battle of Wagram on July 5/6, Archduke Charles of Austria signed the Armistice of Znaim whereafter the Austrian forces withdraw from Tyrol. Thus, the rebels, who had their strongholds in Southern Tyrol, were left fighting alone. They however were able to inflict several defeats to the French and Bavarians forces under Marshal Lefebvre in July, culminating in a complete French retreat after the Third Battle of Bergisel on August 12/13. Hofer now took over the administration of the unoccupied territories at Innsbruck; large parts of Tyrol enjoyed a brief period of independence.

However, in the Treaty of Schönbrunn of October 14, a set of agreements ending the War of the Fifth Coalition, Emperor Francis I of Austria officially gave up any claims to Tyrol. Napoleon ordered the re-conquest of the province the same day. A combination of French military force under the new command of General Jean-Baptiste Drouet and diplomatic de-escalation measures by the rather pro-Tyrolean and anti-Napoleonic Bavarian commander, Prince Ludwig I, was successful in decreasing the numbers of Tyrolean troops that were ready to fight to the death. Those last loyal troops were defeated at the Fourth Battle of Bergisel on November 1, that effectively suppressed the revolt despite minor Tyrolean victories later in November.

Aftermath and execution of Andreas Hofer 

Many of the Tyrolean fighters were killed by the French and Bavarian forces in the following weeks. The leader Andreas Hofer fled into the mountains and hid at several places in South Tyrol. He was betrayed to the French near St Martin in Passeier on January 28, 1810. Hofer was arrested and brought to Mantua, where Eugène de Beauharnais, the French viceroy of Italy, first wanted to pardon him, but was overruled by his stepfather Napoleon. The death penalty was issued on February 19 and executed the next day. Hofer's mortal remains were buried at the Innsbruck Hofkirche in 1823.

In consequence of the civilian insurrection, Bavaria pressured by the French on February 28, 1810 had to cede large parts of Southern Tyrol with the Trentino to Italy and the eastern Hochpustertal with Lienz to the Illyrian Provinces. Upon Napoleon's fall in 1814 and the agreements negotiated at the Congress of Vienna, all parts of Tyrol were re-united under Austrian rule.

In the 19th century, the civilian resistance against supression of Bavarian rulers and Napoleon, the leadership of Andreas Hofer and his execution on Napoleon's order became part of the national narrative, partly transformed into legends and myths, especially for the German speaking Tyrolese. The song Zu Mantua in Banden deals with the execution of Hofer and the fight against the foreign occupants. It became the anthem of the Austrian State of Tyrol in 1948. Hofer's story has been brought to the screen in 1929 in the movie Andreas Hofer - Der Freiheitskampf des Tiroler Volkes (Andres Hofer - The Fight for Freedom of the Tyrolean people). Hofer's life and death was the model for the 1932 film Der Rebell by Luis Trenker. In the 2015 documentary ''„Andreas Hofer – Held wider Willen“``(Andres Hofer - Hero against his will), historians show results of research shifting facts from myths.

References

Further reading

External links
 

History of Tyrol (region)
Conflicts in 1809
1809 in Germany
1809 in Italy
19th-century rebellions
Napoleonic Wars
Wars involving Bavaria
Wars involving France
Wars involving Saxony
Wars involving the Habsburg monarchy
Andreas Hofer